Jeon Jung-kook (born September 1, 1997), known mononymously as Jungkook (stylized as Jung Kook), is a South Korean singer. He is a member and vocalist of the South Korean boy band BTS.

Jungkook has released three solo tracks as part of BTS' discography—"Begin" in 2016, "Euphoria" in 2018, and "My Time" in 2020—all of which charted on South Korea's Gaon Digital Chart. He also recorded the soundtrack song for the BTS-based webtoon 7Fates: Chakho, titled "Stay Alive". In 2022, he featured on American singer-songwriter Charlie Puth's single "Left and Right", which peaked at number 22 on the U.S. Billboard Hot 100. Later that year, he became the first South Korean artist to release an official song for the FIFA World Cup soundtrack with "Dreamers", which he subsequently performed at the 2022 FIFA World Cup Opening Ceremony. Jungkook's solo tracks have also seen success on streaming platforms, with "Dreamers", "Stay Alive", and "Left and Right" each breaking the record for the highest-debuting song by a Korean soloist on the Spotify Global chart.

Early life and education 
Jeon Jung-kook was born on September 1, 1997, in Busan, South Korea. His family consists of his parents and an elder brother. He attended Baekyang Elementary and Middle School in Busan. When he became a trainee, he transferred to Singu Middle School in Seoul. Jungkook initially had dreams of becoming a badminton player when he was younger, but after seeing G-Dragon perform "Heartbreaker" on television, it influenced him to want to become a singer.

In 2011, Jungkook auditioned for the South Korean talent show Superstar K during its auditions in Daegu. Though he was not selected, he received casting offers from seven entertainment companies. He eventually chose to become a trainee under Big Hit Entertainment after seeing RM, now his fellow band member and leader in BTS, perform. To work on his dance skills in preparation for debut, he went to Los Angeles during the summer of 2012 to receive dance training from Movement Lifestyle. In June 2012, he appeared in Jo Kwon's "I'm Da One" music video and also worked as a backup dancer for Glam before his debut.

He graduated from School of Performing Arts Seoul, an arts high school, in 2017. In November 2016, he decided to forgo taking the CSATs, Korea's nationwide university entrance exam. In March 2022, he received his degree from Global Cyber University's Department of Broadcasting and Entertainment. He was awarded the President's Award, the school's highest honor.

Career

2013–present: BTS 

On June 12, 2013, Jungkook made his debut as a member of BTS with the release of the single 2 Cool 4 Skool. Under BTS, he has sung three solo songs. The first, a pop track titled "Begin", from the 2016 album Wings, tells his story of moving to Seoul at a young age to become an idol and expresses his gratitude towards his bandmates for taking care of him during that time. The second, a future bass song titled "Euphoria", was released with an accompanying nine-minute short film on April 5, 2018, as the introduction to the third part of BTS' "Love Yourself" series.  Produced by DJ Swivel, the song charted at number five on the Billboard Bubbling Under Hot 100. Its full studio version was included on BTS' Love Yourself: Answer compilation album, released on August 24. The third solo, "My Time", off the band's 2020 studio album Map of the Soul: 7, is an R&B song about forgoing teenage experiences because of his career, and charted at number 84 on the US Billboard Hot 100. "Euphoria" and "My Time" are the first and second longest-charting solo tracks among K-pop singers on the Billboard World Digital Song Sales chart, having spent a record 90 and 85 weeks respectively on the ranking.

Aside from singing, Jungkook has also helped produce two songs for BTS: "Love is Not Over", from the band's 2015 extended play (EP) The Most Beautiful Moment in Life, Pt. 1, and "Magic Shop", from the band's 2018 album Love Yourself: Tear—he is credited as the main producer for both tracks.

In October 2018, Jungkook was ordained alongside his bandmates with the fifth-class Hwagwan Order of Cultural Merit  by the President of South Korea, Moon Jae-in. He was appointed Special Presidential Envoy for Future Generations and Culture, again alongside his bandmates, by Moon in July 2021, in order to help "lead the global agenda for future generations, such as sustainable growth" and "expand South Korea's diplomatic efforts and global standing" in the international community.

2015–present: Solo activities 

In September 2015, Jungkook participated in the "One Dream, One Korea" campaign, taking part in a song collaboration alongside various Korean artists in memory of the Korean War. The song was released on September 24 and presented at the One K Concert in Seoul on October 15. The following year, Jungkook was cast in the pilot episode of Flower Crew. He also appeared on Celebrity Bromance, and competed on King of Mask Singer under the name "Fencing Man", appearing in episode 72. On November 6, 2018, Jungkook collaborated with American singer Charlie Puth for a special duet performance of the latter's "We Don't Talk Anymore" single at the MBC Plus X Genie Music Awards. He released the self-produced song "Still With You" for free on SoundCloud on June 4, 2020, as part of BTS' annual debut anniversary celebrations.

In February 2022, Jungkook sang the soundtrack for 7Fates: Chakho, a new BTS-based webtoon. Titled "Stay Alive", and  produced by bandmate Suga, the song earned Jungkook his first solo entry on the Billboard Hot 100 with its debut at number 95; his first solo top-ten entry on the Billboard Global Excl. U.S chart at number eight; and became the first Korean soundtrack in history to debut on the Official Singles Chart in the UK, at number 89. Jungkook collaborated again with Puth, featuring on the single "Left and Right", which was released on June 24. On November 20, Jungkook released the single "Dreamers" ahead of his performance at the opening ceremony for the 2022 FIFA World Cup in Qatar later that same day—the single will be included on the tournament's official soundtrack album. He headlined the event at Al Bayt Stadium and performed the song together with Qatari singer Fahad Al Kubaisi, becoming the first Korean artist to sing an official theme for the World Cup and perform at an opening ceremony for the event.

Artistry

Voice and musical style
According to Rolling Stone's Brian Hiatt, Jungkook has "an extraordinarily soulful tenor". Kim Min-sook, writing for the Korean music website Reputation,  described his voice as "soft" and suitable to sentimental songs—she also praised his ability to keep a stable intonation even while dancing—while Mary Siroky of Consequence has said that he "has the kind of clear, dexterous voice built for pop music". Music critic Kim Young-dae considers Jungkook's performance to be the strong point of several BTS songs, such as "Danger", "Butterfly", "Autumn Leaves", and "Lost", as well as his solo effort "Euphoria", commenting that his voice is "specially notable, for both the techniques and his detailed, expressive capacity that attributes a lot [of] narrative to ordinary notes". In 2023, Rolling Stone named him one of the 200 Greatest Singers of All Time, calling him "an extremely gifted singer. He hits high notes with ease and harmonizes with his [BTS] members effortlessly, always giving his audience new ad-libs and unexpected vocal riffs to keep things interesting".

Influences
Jungkook has cited Justin Bieber, Justin Timberlake, and Usher among his musical inspirations.

Impact and influence 
In a 2019 survey conducted by Gallup Korea, Jungkook ranked as the third most-loved celebrity of the year in South Korea. He debuted on the list in 2016 at 20th, then ranked 17th in 2017, and then 8th in 2018. In 2018, Jungkook placed first for 10 weeks in a row for magazine Hi China, under the most beloved celebrities list in China. Jungkook is also extremely popular on social media amongst fans. In December 2018, a video of him singing in the studio became the most retweeted tweet in South Korea that year. Various artists have cited him as an influence and role model, such as Kim Dong-han and Hyeongseop X Euiwoong.

Jungkook's popularity has earned him the nickname "Sold Out King" as items that he is seen using often sell out quickly. These include shoes, Downy fabric softener, wine, novels—namely I Decided to Live as Me by Kim Soo-hyun, which became a best-seller in both Korea and Japan—and Hanbok. Korean media reported that Jungkook had created a "Modern Hanbok" fashion trend in the Korean entertainment industry when celebrities such as Jun Hyun-moo, Jang Do-yeon, Gong Hyo-jin, MC Oh Seung-hwan and The Return of Supermans Park Joo-ho began wearing similar clothing after he was photographed wearing it.

Jungkook was 2019's most-searched male K-pop idol on Google according to their mid-year chart. He topped the chart again in 2020, and was the most searched K-pop idol on YouTube in 2019 and 2020. On Tumblr, he ranked 1st in 'Top K-Pop Stars' for 3 consecutive years. On Twitter, he had the most retweeted tweet of 2019, and the 2nd most retweeted tweet of 2020. In March 2021, Jungkook set a new all-time record for the most real-time viewers in V Live history when his solo live broadcast surpassed 22 million simultaneous viewers—he first broke the record in October 2018, when his broadcast surpassed 3.7 million viewers worldwide.

In June 2021, a lawmaker of the Justice Party used photos of him to promote the legalization of tattoos in South Korea, which works under regulations. The posts were widely condemned by netizens, who accused the lawmaker of taking advantage of Jungkook's fame for political purposes. In the same year images of Jungkook were posted by the mayor of Tagbilaran in the Philippines, John Geesnell Yap, to convince citizens to receive the COVID shot.

Personal life 
In 2017, Jungkook collapsed during a concert in Chile. It was later revealed that he had been feeling unwell that day and there were no underlying issues. He suffered a heel injury on the Love Yourself World Tour in 2018, preventing him from participating in choreography; as a result, he sang while seated during part of the European leg of the tour.

In November 2019, Jungkook was involved in a car accident with a taxi. Neither party had any major injuries and an amicable settlement was agreed upon.

Since 2018, Jungkook has lived in Hannam-dong, Seoul, South Korea with his bandmates. In July 2019, he purchased an apartment in Yongsan District, Seoul worth ₩4 billion, which he gifted to his older brother in December 2020. As of July 2021, Jungkook's net worth was estimated to be US$20 million.

Discography

Charted songs

Other songs

Writing and production credits 
All song credits are adapted from the Korea Music Copyright Association's database, unless otherwise noted.

Filmography

Directing credits

Music videos

Television

Trailers and short films

Awards and nominations

Notes

References

Bibliography

External links

1997 births
Living people
Musicians from Busan
South Korean male singers
South Korean pop singers
South Korean singer-songwriters
South Korean male idols
South Korean tenors
BTS members
21st-century South Korean musicians
Recipients of the Order of Cultural Merit (Korea)
Japanese-language singers of South Korea
English-language singers from South Korea
South Korean child singers
School of Performing Arts Seoul alumni
South Korean male singer-songwriters
Hybe Corporation artists
Fifa World Cup ceremonies performers